Protestants compose less than 1% of the population of Tajikistan.
There is a Lutheran congregation in Dushanbe.
There are about 3,000 evangelicals, who mainly are of Russian origin.
The Constitution provides for religious freedom.
There is a Seventh-day Adventist congregation in Tajikistan.
Many Christians are from South Asia.
According to the European Baptist Federation, government officials view the nation's Christians in the same light as militant Muslims.

Baptist Brotherhood of Tajikistan 
Baptist work in Tajikistan started in 1929.
The Baptist Brotherhood of Tajikistan consists of seven self-governing churches and 23 affiliate groups.
According to the European Baptist Federation, the Baptist community has around 1000 members.
The chairman of the Baptist Brotherhood of Tajikistan is the Russian-German Alexandr Vervai. 
There is mission of Baptists among Tajiks.

List of Denominations
Baptist Churches in Tajikistan
German Evangelical Lutheran Church
Korean Methodist Church
Pentecostal Churches

References

Tajikistan
Christianity in Tajikistan
Protestantism in Asia